Fisher, California may refer to:
Fisher, Humboldt County, California
Fisher, Shasta County, California